Tony Palacios is the lead guitarist of the Christian hard rock band, Guardian. Palacios joined the band in 1986 and has remained with them since, releasing nine studio albums, including three in Spanish.

In 1998, Palacios released his first instrumental guitar solo album entitled Epic Tales of Whoa! on Cadence Records. The album was assembled over a ten-year period, and received critical acclaim from the metal community. Presently he is working as a sound mixer, engineer, and producer for various Christian artists.

Palacios is best known for his use of synthetic noises in combination with "natural" guitars and other instruments to create interesting or inspiring sounds.

References

Living people
1960 births
American performers of Christian music
American heavy metal guitarists
20th-century American guitarists